The 2016 Supertaça Cândido de Oliveira was the 38th edition of the Supertaça Cândido de Oliveira. It took place on 7 August 2016, and it featured the champions of the 2015–16 Primeira Liga, Benfica, and the winners of the 2015–16 Taça de Portugal, Braga.

Background
Benfica made their 18th Supertaça appearance. Their last appearance had been in 2015, where they lost 1–0 to Sporting CP at the Estádio Algarve. Benfica had won five Supertaças, in 1980, 1985, 1989, 2005 and 2014.

Braga played in the fixture for the third time. Their last presence had been in 1998 where they lost 2–1 on aggregate against Porto. Braga had not won any edition, being runners-up in 1982 and 1998.

Pre-match

Entry
Benfica qualified for their third consecutive Supertaça Cândido de Oliveira by winning the league title. On the last matchday, Benfica won 4–1 against Nacional at Estádio da Luz to clinch the Primeira Liga for the 35th time.

Braga qualified by winning the cup final, beating Porto 4–2 on penalties, after a 2–2 draw. This was Braga's second Taça de Portugal triumph.

Broadcasting
The final was broadcast by TVI.

Officials

Ticketing

Venue

Match

Details

Statistics

References

Supertaça Cândido de Oliveira
S.L. Benfica matches
S.C. Braga matches
2016–17 in Portuguese football
August 2016 sports events in Europe